Lumi is an album by  Finnish avant-garde jazz composer, bandleader and drummer Edward Vesala recorded in 1986 and released on the ECM label in 1987.

Reception
Critical reception to the album has been divided.

Describing the album as an “unqualified masterpiece”, The Penguin Guide to Jazz selected it as part of its suggested Core Collection, and also awarded it a "Crown" indicating an album for which the authors felt “special admiration or affection”.

The Allmusic review awarded the album 2 stars.

Track listing
All compositions by Edward Vesala except as indicated
 "The Wind" - 9:00
 "Frozen Melody" - 4:19
 "Calypso Bulbosa" - 4:52
 "Third Moon" - 2:53
 "Lumi" - 6:36
 "Camel Walk" - 4:58
 "Fingo" - 3:23
 "Early Messenger" - 2:31
 "Together" (Edward Vesala, Tomasz Stańko) - 6:14
Recorded at Finnvox Studios in Helsinki, Finland in June 1986

Personnel
Edward Vesala - drums, percussion
Esko Heikkinen - trumpet, piccolo trumpet
Pentti Lahti - alto saxophone, baritone saxophone, flute
Jorma Tapio - alto saxophone, clarinet, bass clarinet, flute
Tapani Rinne - tenor saxophone, soprano saxophone, clarinet
Kari Heinilä - tenor saxophone, soprano saxophone, flute
Tom Bildo - trombone, tuba
Iro Haarla - piano, harp
Raoul Björkenheim - guitar
Taito Vainio - accordion
Häkä - bass

References

ECM Records albums
Edward Vesala albums
1987 albums
Albums produced by Manfred Eicher